The Competizione dell'Opera is an international singing competition based Germany for singers specializing in Italian opera.

History
In 1996, a new international singing competition was born that focused on Italian operas: "I Cestelli Competizione dell' Opera". Following its two appearances in Hamburg in 1996 and 1998, the competition has been established in Dresden since 2001.

The participants of the competition apply with sixth different arias in the qualifying round for semi final of the Italian Opera. The best ten out of the qualifying rounds are able to participate at the final.

Singers who were once finalists and winners of the competition include Marina Mescheriakova, Ashley Holland, Lado Ataneli, Anja Harteros, Carla Maria Izzo, Woo-Kyung Kim, and Latonia Moore. The international jury comprises representatives from the major European opera houses and festivals, artists' managers, famous singers, directors and representatives from the media and from music academies. In 2008 the finals concert took place in the Semperoper in Dresden with the Saarländischen Rundfunks Symphony Orchestra.

Main Sponsors 

 A. Lange & Söhne 
 HypoVereinsbank

Organizers 
 Eva-Maria Stange, Saxon State Minister for Science and the Fine Arts (Patroness)
 Hans-Joachim Frey, Generalintendant of Theater Bremen
 Uta-Christine Deppermann, Arts Manager of the State Theatre Braunschweig

Sources 
 Competizione dell`Opera
 Forum für Kultur und Wirtschaft
 Klavierwettbewerb Rubinstein

Opera competitions
Music competitions in Germany